Saint-Michel-de-Plélan (literally Saint-Michel of Plélan) is a commune in the Côtes-d'Armor department of Brittany in northwestern France.

Population

Inhabitants of Saint-Michel-de-Plélan are called michelois in French.

See also
 Communes of the Côtes-d'Armor department

References

Communes of Côtes-d'Armor